Pernille Sørensen (born 15 September 1977) is a Norwegian comedian, actress and screenwriter.

Early life
Sørensen studied media and political science at the Norwegian University of Science and Technology (NTNU) in Trondheim and from 1998 to 2002, state and politics in the Middle East and North Africa at the University of Oslo.

Career
From 2002 to 2006, Sørensen worked as an actress in the sketch series Melonas. In 2009, she starred in the children's film Knerten, portraying Lillebror's mother. In 2010 and 2011 respectively, she reprised her role in the two sequels Knerten gifter seg and Knerten i knipe. In 2011, she was the screenwriter of the television series Åse Tonight, in which she also starred. Since 2013, she has played one of the leading roles in the NRK series Side om side. In February 2015, she became one of the two permanent team members in the comedy show Nytt på nytt. She also works as a stand-up comedian.

Personal life
Sørensen is married to fellow comedian Dagfinn Lyngbø and they have two children.

Awards 
 2003: Komiprisen (Best newcomer)
 2016: Komiprisen (Funniest of the year)

References

External links 
 

1977 births
Living people
People from Bærum
Norwegian film actresses
Norwegian television actresses
Norwegian screenwriters
Norwegian women comedians
Norwegian stand-up comedians
20th-century Norwegian actresses
21st-century Norwegian actresses
Norwegian women screenwriters